Dresbachia is an extinct genus from a well-known class of fossil marine arthropods, the trilobites. It lived from 501 to 490 million years ago during the Dresbachian faunal stage of the late Cambrian Period.

References

Ptychoparioidea
Ptychopariida genera
Cambrian trilobites
Fossils of the United States